The 1964 United States presidential election in Ohio was held on November 3, 1964 as part of the 1964 United States presidential election. Voters chose 26 representatives, or electors, to the Electoral College, who voted for President and Vice President. 

Ohio was overwhelmingly won by the Democratic Party nominee, incumbent President Lyndon B. Johnson, who carried the state with 62.94% of the vote against Republican Party Barry Goldwater’s 37.06%. 

The 1964 election marks the only time a Democratic candidate for president won Ohio with over 60% of the popular vote (and the last time a nominee from either party has done so), the last time the Democratic candidate carried more counties than the Republican candidate, and the last time the margin of victory for the Democratic candidate was in double digits.

This is the only election since the Civil War in which Clinton, Warren and Geauga Counties have voted for a Democratic presidential candidate. Ashland, Auglaize, Butler, Champaign, Clermont, Crawford, Darke, Defiance, Fairfield, Fayette, Greene, Hardin, Henry, Highland, Holmes, Knox, Licking, Logan, Madison, Marion, Medina, Miami, Morgan, Morrow, Muskingum, Paulding, Pickaway, Preble, Putnam, Richland, Shelby, Van Wert, Washington, Wayne, Williams, and Wyandot counties have never voted Democratic since, while Franklin County did not vote Democratic again until 1996 and Hamilton County did not do so again until 2008.

Results

Results by county

See also
 United States presidential elections in Ohio

References

1964 Ohio elections
Ohio
1964